The 1916 United States presidential election in Pennsylvania took place on November 7, 1916 as part of the 1916 United States presidential election. Voters chose 38 representatives, or electors to the Electoral College, who voted for president and vice president.

Pennsylvania overwhelmingly voted for the Republican nominee, U.S. Supreme Court Justice and former New York Governor Charles Evans Hughes, over the Democratic nominee, President Woodrow Wilson. Hughes won Pennsylvania by a large margin of 14.04%.

With 56.26% of the vote, Pennsylvania would prove to be Hughes' third strongest state in terms of popular votes percentage after Vermont and neighboring New Jersey.

Results

Results by  County

See also
 List of United States presidential elections in Pennsylvania

References

 

Pennsylvania
1916
1916 Pennsylvania elections